Patrick Heusinger (born February 14, 1981) is an American actor, known for his roles on the television series Girlfriends' Guide to Divorce, Gossip Girl, Royal Pains and Absentia.

Early life
Heusinger was born and raised in Jacksonville, Florida, where he attended Douglas Anderson School of the Arts. He is a graduate of Juilliard.

Career
Heusinger made his debut in the 2005 independent period drama film Sweet Land, as young Lars, and then appeared in Tie a Yellow Ribbon, The Nanny Diaries, and Black Swan.

On television, Heusinger is best known for the roles of Lord Marcus on the CW teen drama Gossip Girl, where he appeared on four episodes in 2008, and Adam on USA Network's Royal Pains in 2010 and 2011. He was also in a recurring role as Max McCarthy on Bravo TV's first original scripted series Girlfriends' Guide to Divorce. Other television credits include 30 Rock, The Good Wife, Law & Order: Special Victims Unit, Rescue Me, Unforgettable, and Necessary Roughness.

Heusinger starred as Lancelot in the national tour of Spamalot from 2006 through 2008. In 2010, he starred in the Naked Angels' Tony-nominated Broadway production of Next Fall.  Other theater credits include the off-Broadway production of Next Fall and the Broadway revival of Fiddler on the Roof (as Fyedka).

In 2009, Heusinger appeared in the comedy web series Jack in a Box. In 2010 and 2011, he appeared in the comedy web series Submissions Only. In 2013, he had a guest-starring story arc on the NBC survival drama series Revolution as bounty hunter Adam. As of 2015, he has a guest-starring role on the Hulu original series, Casual as Michael, a photography teacher. Heusinger was cast as Special Agent Nick Durand in the AXN series Absentia that premiered in 2017.

Filmography

Film

Television

Web

Video games

References

External links
 
 
 

21st-century American male actors
American male film actors
American male musical theatre actors
American male television actors
Living people
Juilliard School alumni
Male actors from Jacksonville, Florida
1981 births
American people of German descent
American male video game actors